French-Turkmen relations are the bilateral relations between France and Turkmenistan. France has an embassy in Ashgabat and Turkmenistan has an embassy in Paris. Both countries are full members of the OSCE and the United Nations.

History 

Diplomatic relations were established on March 6, 1992 following the signing of a declaration of friendship.

High level visits
The first official visit to Ashgabat by a French President was made on April 28, 1994 by François Mitterrand. 2 years later on September 9, 1996, Saparmurat Niyazov paid an official visit to France, where he held talks with President Jacques Chirac, and Foreign Minister Hervé de Charette. In April 2008, French Minister of Foreign and European Affairs Bernard Kouchner visited Turkmenistan to open a new building of the French Embassy in Ashgabat, with the Ambassador of France to Turkmenistan Christian Lechervy. Gurbanguly Berdimuhamedow visited Paris twice during his presidency, holding talks with French President Nicolas Sarkozy on February 1, 2012, and attending a prestigious horse race in October of that year.

Economic cooperation 
First appeared on the Turkmen market in 1994, the French construction company Bouygues, the company is the second largest in Turkmenistan signed contracts for the construction of buildings. French company Thales Alenia Space construction of the first space satellite TurkmenSat 1.

See also
Foreign relations of France
Foreign relations of Turkmenistan

References

External links
 French Embassy in Turkmeistan
  French Ministry of Foreign affairs about the relations with Turkmenistan 

 
 
Turkmenistan
Bilateral relations of Turkmenistan